The 1965–66 season was Mansfield Town's 29th season in the Football League and 5th in the Third Division, they finished in 19th position with 38 points, two above the relegation zone.

Final league table

Results

Football League Third Division

FA Cup

League Cup

Squad statistics
 Squad list sourced from

References
General
 Mansfield Town 1965–66 at soccerbase.com (use drop down list to select relevant season)

Specific

Mansfield Town F.C. seasons
Mansfield Town